The Hayes River is a river in the Kitikmeot and Kivalliq Regions of Nunavut, Canada. It is in the Arctic Ocean drainage basin and is a tributary of the Back River.

Course
The river begins at an unnamed lake in Kivalliq Region, and reaches its mouth at the Back River in Kitikmeot Region, just south of that river's mouth at Cockburn Bay on Chantrey Inlet on the Arctic Ocean.

References

Rivers of Kitikmeot Region
Rivers of Kivalliq Region